The stone crab refers to a crustacean native to North American coastal waters.

Florida stone crab

It may also refer to a minor league baseball team, affiliated with the Tampa Bay Rays.

Charlotte Stone Crabs

Animal common name disambiguation pages